The Punisher is the first ongoing comic book series starring the fictional Marvel Comics vigilante The Punisher, following The Punisher limited series published the previous year. The series ran 104 issues from July 1987 to July 1995.

Publication history
It became the flagship of a popular franchise that would grow to include such titles as The Punisher War Journal and The Punisher War Zone, as well as several miniseries. This series also spawned seven annuals from 1988 to 1994, as well as the annuals The Punisher Summer Special #1-4 (1991–1994), The Punisher: Back to School Special #1-3 (1992–1994), and The Punisher Holiday Special #1-3 (1993–1995).

Prints

Issues

 Marching Powder
 Bolivia
 The Devil Came from Kansas!
 The Rev
 Ministry of Death
 Garbage
 Wild Rose
 The Ghost of Wall Street
 Insider Trading
 The Creep
 Second Sight
 Castle Technique
 Sacrifice Play
 Social Studies
 To Topple the Kingpin
 Escalation
 Computer War
 Face Off
 The Spider
 Bad Tip
 The Boxer
 Ninja Training Camp
 Capture the Flag!
 Land of the Eternal Sun
 Sunset in Kansas
 The Whistle Blower
 Your Tax Dollars at Work
 AoV - Change Partners & Dance
 AoV - Too many Dooms
 Confession
 Crankin'
 Speedy Solution
 Reaver Fever
 Exo-Skeleton
 Jigsaw Puzzle 01
 Jigsaw Puzzle 02
 Jigsaw Puzzle 03
 Jigsaw Puzzle 04
 Jigsaw Puzzle 05
 Jigsaw Puzzle 06
 Should a Gentleman offer a Tiparillo to a Lady
 St. Paradine's
 Border Run
 Flag Burner
 One Way Fare
 Cold Cache
 The Brattle Gun 01
 The Brattle Gun 02
 Death below Zero
 Yo Yo
 Golden Buddha
 Lupe
 The Final Days 01
 The Final Days 02
 The Final Days 03
 The Final Days 04
 The Final Days 05
 The Final Days 06
 The Final Days 07
 Escape from New York
 Crackdown
 Fade... to white
 The Big Check-Out
 Eurohit 01
 Eurohit 02
 Eurohit 03
 Eurohit 04
 Eurohit 05
 Eurohit 06
 Eurohit 07
 Loose Ends
 Life during Wartime
 Police Action 01
 Police Action 02
 Police Action 03
 Lava
 Survival 01
 Survival 02
 Survival 03
 Last Confession
 Bodies of Evidence
 Firefight 01
 Firefight 02
 Firefight 03
 Suicide Run 00
 Suicide Run 03
 Suicide Run 06
 Suicide Run 09
 Fortress Miami 01
 Fortress Miami 02
 Fortress Miami 03
 Fortress Miami 04
 Killing Streets
 No Rules 01
 No Rules 02
 Raving Beauty
 The Devil's Secret Name
 Armies of the Night
 Bury me Deep
 The Cage
 Dead Tomorrows
 Under the Gun
 Countdown 04
 Countdown 01

Annuals
 1988 - Evolutionary War (02 of 11)
 1989 - Atlantis Attacks (05 of 14)
 1990 - Lifeform (1 of 4)
 1991 - Von Strucker Gambit (2 of 3)
 1992 - The System Bytes (1 of 4)
 1993 - Eradikation
 1994 - Eurohit '94

Bibliography
Punisher #1-104 (July 1987 – July 1995)
Punisher Annual #1-7 (1988–1994)
The Punisher Summer Special #1-4 (1991–1994)
The Punisher: Back to School Special #1-3 (1992–1994)
The Punisher Holiday Special #1-3 (1993–1995)

Collected editions
Essential Punisher, Vol. 2 (collects The Punisher vol. 2, #1-20, Annual #1), 2007, 
Essential Punisher, Vol. 3 (collects The Punisher vol. 2, #21-40, Annual #2-3), 2009, 
Essential Punisher, Vol. 4 (collects The Punisher vol. 2, #41-59, Annual #4-5), 2012,

See also
 1987 in comics

External links

1987 series
1987 comics debuts
Defunct American comics
Comics set in New York City